Job ( – Īyyōḇ;  – Iṓb) is the central figure of the Book of Job in the Bible. In rabbinical literature, Job is called one of the prophets of the Gentiles. In Islam, Job is also considered a prophet.

Job is presented as a good and prosperous family man who is suddenly beset with horrendous disasters that take away all he holds dear—a scenario intended to test Job's faith in God. Struggling mightily to understand this situation, Job reflects on his despair but consistently remains devout.

In the Hebrew Book of Job 

The Hebrew Book of Job is part of Ketuvim ("Writings") of the Hebrew Bible. Not much is known about Job based on the Masoretic Text.

The characters in the Book of Job consist of Job, his wife, his three friends (Bildad, Eliphaz, and Zophar), a man named Elihu, God, and angels (one of whom is called Satan, which means 'Adversary').

It begins with an introduction to Job's character—he is described as a blessed man who lives righteously in the Land of Uz. The Lord's praise of Job prompts an angel with the title of "satan" ("Adversary") to suggest that Job served God simply because God protected him. God removes Job's protection and gives permission to the angel to take his wealth, his children, and his physical health (but not his life). Despite his difficult circumstances, he does not curse God, but rather curses the day of his birth. And although he anguishes over his plight, he stops short of accusing God of injustice. Job's miserable earthly condition is simply God's will.

In the following, Job debates with three friends concerning his condition. They argue whether it was justified, and they debate solutions to his problems. Job ultimately condemns all their counsel, beliefs, and critiques of him as false. God then appears to Job and his friends out of a whirlwind, not answering Job's central questions. Job, by staying silent before God, stresses the point that he understands that his affliction is God's will even though he despairs at not knowing why. Job appears faithful without direct knowledge of God and without demands for special attention from God, even for a cause that all others would declare to be just. And the text gives an allusion to : "And unto man he said, Behold, the fear of the Lord, that is wisdom; and to depart from evil is understanding".

God rebukes the three friends and gives them instruction for the remission of sin, followed by Job being restored to an even better condition than his former wealthy state. Job is blessed to have seven sons, and three daughters named Jemimah (which means "dove"), Keziah ("cinnamon"), and Keren-happuch ("horn of eye-makeup"). His daughters were said to be the most beautiful women in the land.

In the Greek Old Testament Book of Job

The Septuagint, an ancient Greek translation of the Hebrew Old Testament, has a revised and updated final verse that claims Job's genealogy, asserting him to be a grandson of Esau and a ruler of Edom.

In other religious texts

Judaism 
 He is mentioned in the Book of Ezekiel.
 He is cited as someone "who held fast to all the ways of justice" in the deuterocanonical Book of Sirach.

Christianity 
 He is praised for his perseverance in the Christian Epistle of James.
 He is the protagonist of a pseudepigraphal book called the Testament of Job.
 He is also mentioned in the Doctrine and Covenants, one of the four sacred texts of the Church of Jesus Christ of Latter-day Saints (LDS Church).

Islam 
 He is discussed as a prophet in the Quran by the name of Ayūb. 
The Quran describes Job as a righteous servant of Allah, who was afflicted by suffering for a lengthy period of time. However, it clearly states that Job never lost faith in God and forever called to God in prayer, asking Him to remove his affliction:

And [mention] Job, when he called to his Lord, "Indeed, adversity has touched me, and you are the Most Merciful of the merciful."

— Quran, sura 21 (The Prophets), ayah 83

Baháʼí 
In the writings of the Baháʼí Faith: A lengthy tablet was written by Bahá'u'lláh, the first part of which is focused on Job. The Tablet is often referred to as the Tablet of Patience or the Tablet of Job.

Job in Judaism

A clear majority of rabbis saw Job as having in fact existed as a historically factual figure.

According to a minority view, Job never existed. In this view, Job was a literary creation by a prophet who used this form of writing to convey a divine message. On the other hand, the Talmud (in Tractate Baba Batra 15a–16b) goes to great lengths trying to ascertain when Job actually lived, citing many opinions and interpretations by the leading sages.

Job is further mentioned in the Talmud as follows:

Job's resignation to his fate.
When Job was prosperous, anyone who associated with him even to buy from him or sell to him, was blessed.
Job's reward for being generous
David, Job and Ezekiel described the Torah's length without putting a number to it.
Job was in fact one of three advisors that Pharaoh consulted, prior to taking action against the increasingly multiplying Israelites in the Book of Exodus. As described in the Talmud: Balaam urged Pharaoh to kill the Hebrew new-born boys; Jethro opposed this decree; and Job, though personally opposed to the decree, kept silent and did not protest it. It is for Job's silence that God subsequently punishes him with his bitter afflictions. However, the Book of Job itself contains no indication of this, and to the prophet Ezekiel, Yahweh refers to Job as a righteous man of the same calibre as Noah and Daniel.

Christian views
Christianity accepts the Book of Job as canon in its Old Testament. In addition, Job is mentioned in the New Testament of the Christian Bible: the Epistle of James paraphrases Job as an example of patience in suffering.

Job's declaration, "I know that my redeemer liveth", is considered by some Christians to be a proto-Christian reference to Christ as the Redeemer, and is the basis of several Christian hymns, as well as the opening scene of Part III of Handel's Messiah. However, Jewish bible commentators and scholars point out that Job "insists on a divine hearing in his lifetime" (cf. Job 16:19–22).

He is commemorated by the Lutheran Church–Missouri Synod in their Calendar of Saints on May 9, by the Roman Catholic Church on May 10, and by the Eastern Orthodox and Byzantine Catholic churches on May 6.

He is also commemorated by the Armenian Apostolic Church on May 6 and December 26, and by the Coptic Orthodox Church on April 27 and August 29. The Armenian Apostolic Church commemorates Job along with John the Baptist on the Thursday after the third Sunday of the Feast of the Assumption.

Islamic views and Quranic account

In the Qur'an, Job is considered a prophet in Islam. The narrative frame of Job's story in Islam is similar to the Hebrew Bible story but, in Islam, the emphasis is paid to Job remaining steadfast to God and there is no record of his bitterness or defiance, or mention of lengthy discussions with friends. Some Muslim commentators also spoke of Job as being the ancestor of the Romans. 
Muslim literature also comments on Job's time and place of prophecy, saying that he came after Joseph in the prophetic series and that he preached to his own people rather than being sent to a specified community. Tradition further recounts that Job will be the leader of the group of "those who patiently endured" in Heaven. Philip K. Hitti asserted that the subject was an Arab and the setting was Northern Arabia.

The Qur'an mentions Job's narrative in a concise manner. Similar to the Hebrew Bible narrative, Islamic tradition mentions that Satan heard the angels of God speak of Job as being the most faithful man of his generation. Job, being a chosen prophet of God, would remain committed in daily prayer and would frequently call to God, thanking God for blessing him with abundant wealth and a large family. But Satan planned to turn the God-fearing Job away from God and wanted Job to fall into disbelief and corruption. Therefore, God allowed Satan to afflict Job with distress and intense illness and suffering, as God knew that Job would never turn away from his Lord.

The Qur'an describes Job as a righteous servant of Allah (God), who was afflicted by suffering for a lengthy period of time. However, it clearly states that Job never lost faith in God and forever called to God in prayer, asking him to remove his affliction:

The narrative goes on to state that after many years of suffering, God ordered Job to "Strike with thy foot!". At once, Job struck the ground with his foot and God caused a cool spring of water to gush forth from the Earth, from which Job could replenish himself. The Qur'an says that it was then that God removed his pain and suffering and He returned Job's family to him, blessed him with many generations of descendants and granted him great wealth. In addition to the brief descriptions of Job's narrative, the Qur'an further mentions Job twice in the lists of those whom God had given special guidance, wisdom and inspiration (IV: 163) and as one of the men who received authority, the Book and the gift of prophethood (VI:84).

Local traditions regarding Job
 

There are at least two locations that claim to be the place of Job's ordeal, and at least three that claim to have his tomb.

The Eyüp Sultan Mosque in Istanbul, Turkey, holds the tomb of Abu Ayyub al-Ansari, a companion of Muhammad, not the biblical/Qur'anic Job (Ayyub in Arabic, Eyüp in Turkish), though some locals tend to conflate the two.

Israel and Palestine
In Palestinian folk tradition, Job's place of trial is Al-Jura, or Al-Joura, a village outside the town of Al-Majdal (today's Ashkelon, Israel). It was there God rewarded him with a fountain of youth that removed whatever illnesses he had, and gave him back his youth.

To the northwest of the depopulated Palestinian village of Dayr Ayyub is an area which, according to the village belief, contained the tomb of the prophet Ayyub, the biblical Job.

In the area of Tabgha (Greek: Heptapegon), on the shore of the Sea of Galilee, a few sites are associated by local tradition with the life of Ayyub. A small grotto near the base of what is known to Christians as the Mount of Beatitudes, or Mount Eremos, is known as Mghraret Ayub ("Job's Cave"). Two of the towers built in the Byzantine period to collect the water of the Heptapegon springs are named in Arabic Tannur Ayub ("Job's Kiln") and Hammam Ayyub ("Job's Bath"). Hammam Ayyub was initially called "the Leper's Bath", but the leper was later identified with Job; the nearby spring, now a waterfall, is known as Ain Ayub, "Job's Spring".

Hauran, Syria
The town of al-Shaykh Saad in the Hauran region in Syria has been associated with Job since at least the 4th-century AD. Karnein was mentioned in Eusebius' Onomasticon as a town of Bashan that was said to be the location of the house of Job. Egeria the pilgrim relates that a church was built over the place in March or February 384 AD, and that the place was known as the "town of Job", or "civitas Job". According to Egeria's account the body of Job was laid in a stone coffin below the altar. According to tradition, Hammam Ayyub is a fountain in the town where Job washed himself when he was sick, and is reputed to have healing powers. Another holy artifact in the town is the "Rock of Job", known in local folklore as the place where he sat when he was afflicted with the disease.

Adma', Upper Mesopotamia
The city of Urfa (ancient Adma', later Edessa) in the Şanlıurfa Province, or Harran region of southeastern Turkey, also claims to be the location at which Job underwent his ordeal in a cave. The location boasts an Ottoman-style mosque and madrasa that runs as shops today. A well exists within the complex, said to be the one formed when he struck the ground with his foot as described in the Quran. The water is considered to be miraculously curing. The whole complex underwent recent restoration. The tomb of Job is located outside the city of Urfa.

Oman
The Tomb of Job is also said to be situated in Jabal Qarah outside the city of Salalah in southern Oman.

El-Chouf mountains, Lebanon
Additionally, the Druze community also maintains a shrine for the Prophet Job in Niha village in the Chouf mountains of Lebanon. This shrine is said to be the place where Job was healed from his ailments after his wife carried his frail body up the steep mountain in a basket so he dies up there. Instead, he was healed and given an even larger wealth.

Gallery

See also

 Behemoth
 Biblical and Quranic narratives
 Book of Job in Byzantine illuminated manuscripts
 Jobab ben Zerah
 Prophets of Islam
 Stories of The Prophets
 Testament of Job

References

External links

 Book of Job with Hebrew and English
 Themes of Job
 Summary of Job's life.
 Aristeas identifies Job with the Jobab mentioned in Genesis 36:33, a great-grandson of Esau
 An international fraternal organization for young women based on the teachings of the book of Job.
 The Story of Ayyub (Job). The same page is also available here
 "Job", Forest Park Monuments, NYC Dept of Parks & Recreation
 360 Degree Tour of Prophet Job's Tomb in Urfa, Turkey

 
Christian saints from the Old Testament
Book of Job people
Prophets in the Druze faith
People whose existence is disputed